Chang King-yuh (born 27 April 1937) is a Taiwanese politician. He was Minister of the Mainland Affairs Council of the Executive Yuan from 28 February 1996 to 31 January 1999.

Education
Chang obtained his bachelor's degree in law from National Taiwan University, master's degree in diplomacy from National Chengchi University, master's degree in comparative law and doctoral degree from Columbia University in the United States.

Early career
Chang was the President of National Chengchi University from 1989 to 1994.

See also
 Cross-Strait relations
 Straits Exchange Foundation
 Taiwan Affairs Office

References

1937 births
Living people
Government ministers of Taiwan
Taiwanese people from Hunan
People from Xiangtan
Presidents of universities and colleges in Taiwan
Taiwanese expatriates in the United States
National Taiwan University alumni
Columbia University alumni
Academic staff of the National Chengchi University
National Chengchi University alumni
Republic of China politicians from Hunan